Joshua M. Bilicki (born June 3, 1995) is an American professional stock car racing driver who competes part-time in the NASCAR Cup Series, driving the No. 78 Chevrolet Camaro ZL1 for Live Fast Motorsports and part-time in the NASCAR Xfinity Series driving the No. 91 for DGM Racing. He has also previously competed in the NASCAR Camping World Truck Series, and in sports car racing.

Racing career

Early years
Starting with kid-karts at age four, Bilicki quickly moved through the ranks and into the next classes.  After several years in kid-karts and the Yamaha 100cc engine class, he moved to 80cc Shifter Karts.  Bilicki showed his dominance quickly by winning many regional and national races, including the 2008 Road America SKUSA Super-Nationals, which brought competition from across the globe.  Several times he even competed against and beat faster 125cc Shifter Karts.  In 2011, Bilicki made the jump to 125cc Shifter Karts, and in 2012 Bilicki was recognized by and brought on board the Andrew Chase Racing-PCR team, competing in the Midwest Shifter Kart Series in a brand new PCR Shifter Kart.

Sports cars
After racing Shifter Karts at a top level for nearly five years, Bilicki made the transition to sportscars at age fifteen in 2011, beginning with Spec Miata and the Sports Car Club of America (SCCA).  Within his first year of sportscar racing, he proved himself once again by earning two pole positions, four top-five finishing positions, and three podiums.  After earning his national racing license in 2012, Bilicki began racing the SCCA Majors Tour and has qualified for the famed SCCA National Championship Runoffs every attempt tried.  2012 also marked his debut in an Area Sportsman Stock Car at a local circle track, Jefferson Speedway.

After several successful years of racing Spec Miata nationally, 2015 marked Bilicki's first year of professional sportscar racing in the IMSA Continental Tire Sportscar Challenge. He also raced a Spec Miata in the SCCA U.S. Majors Tour.

NASCAR

Bilicki debuted in the Xfinity Series with Obaika Racing at Road America in 2016. In a blog post, he said that he got his ride by contacting teams that had "TBA" on the entry list the week of the race, and he got a call back from Obaika, offering him a spot. Unfortunately, a crash in qualifying and a dead battery during the race derailed his weekend at his home track, and he finished 38th. Bilicki returned to Obaika Racing, albeit this time in the No. 97, for the Ticket Galaxy 200, his first oval start since 2012. Starting last in the 40-car field, he avoided trouble and worked his way up to 28th position. He continued his stint with Obaika for the Ford EcoBoost 300, staying in the 97 car alongside Ryan Ellis in Obaika's other entry, the No. 77. Bilicki started 37th and finished 34th.

Bilicki returned to the No. 77 in 2017, along with other races planned with Obaika. In April, Bilicki announced he would make his Monster Energy NASCAR Cup Series debut in June's Toyota/Save Mart 350 at Sonoma Raceway, driving the No. 51 for Rick Ware Racing. After starting 33rd, he finished 36th. Bilicki also drove an Xfinity Series race at Michigan International Speedway for MBM Motorsports, finishing 27th. He ran another race for Rick Ware Racing in Cup, but it was not the second road course race as planned. Instead, Bilicki made his Monster Energy NASCAR Cup Series oval debut at New Hampshire. Later in the season, he signed a deal to run all three of the Xfinity road courses for B. J. McLeod Motorsports, running the organization's No. 8 entry. After pit road speeding penalties at Watkins Glen and a crash at Mid-Ohio, Bilicki ran down Elliott Sadler in the final green flag run to finish twelfth at his home track, Road America. He continued his relationship with McLeod a couple weeks later, driving the team's flagship No. 78 at Chicagoland Speedway.

On February 5, 2018, it was announced that Bilicki would attempt the full Xfinity season for startup team JP Motorsports, bringing with him previous sponsor Prevagen to the No. 45.

On February 4, 2019, it was announced that Bilicki would join RSS Racing to pilot the team's No. 38 Chevrolet Camaro for the full 2019 NASCAR Xfinity Series season. In May, he made his NASCAR Gander Outdoors Truck Series debut in the Digital Ally 250 at Kansas Speedway, driving the No. 34 for Reaume Brothers Racing. He also returned to the Monster Energy NASCAR Cup Series in June, driving for Rick Ware Racing at Michigan. Later in the month, he drove Ware's No. 53 at Chicagoland. Before the Kansas Lottery 300 in October, he announced he would drive for B. J. McLeod Motorsports for the remainder of the 2019 season.

On May 11, 2020, Bilicki and Tommy Baldwin Racing announced that they would partner for the 2020 The Real Heroes 400. He also drove sporadically for B. J. McLeod Motorsports, and tied his career-high finish in the Xfinity Series with a 12th-place finish at the Daytona International Speedway road course.

On January 19, 2021, Bilicki announced he would compete full-time in the Cup Series for RWR. He would also make a handful of starts in the NASCAR Xfinity Series for SS-Green Light Racing, driving the 07 and 17. 

In the 2021 Coke Zero Sugar 400, Bilicki survived to the finish, resulting in him initially finishing in 11th place. However, Chris Buescher would later be disqualified, promoting Bilicki up to 10th place. This marks Bilicki’s first-ever Top 10 in the top 3 NASCAR divisions. Bilicki would not return to Rick Ware Racing in 2022. Instead, he would drive the No. 77 Chevrolet Camaro ZL1 for Spire Motorsports, the team he drove for in 2 races in 2020, for a near-full season. 

In the 2022 Xfinity Series season, Bilicki drove for DGM Racing in the 2022 Beef. It's What's for Dinner. 300. He finished 9th, scoring his first Xfinity Series Top 10 in the process.

On December 12, 2022, Bilicki was announced to drive the Live Fast Motorsports No. 78 on a part-time schedule in 2023.

Snowmobile
Bilicki won the Outlaw 600 division race at the 2019 World Championship Snowmobile Derby in his home state.

Personal life
Bilicki works as a driving coach and instructor when he is not behind the wheel. He is close friends with fellow NASCAR driver Camden Murphy.

Motorsports career results

SCCA National Championship Runoffs

NASCAR
(key) (Bold – Pole position awarded by qualifying time. Italics – Pole position earned by points standings or practice time. * – Most laps led.)

Cup Series

Daytona 500

Xfinity Series

Camping World Truck Series

 Season still in progress
 Ineligible for series points
 Bilicki switched from Cup points to Xfinity points in late 2021.

References

External links

 

1995 births
People from Richfield, Washington County, Wisconsin
Racing drivers from Wisconsin
Living people
SCCA National Championship Runoffs participants
NASCAR drivers